The 1972 San Diego Padres season was the fourth season in franchise history.

Offseason 
 January 12, 1972: Rich Troedson was drafted by the Padres in the 1st round (6th pick) of the secondary phase of the 1972 Major League Baseball draft.

Regular season 
Until 2021, no Padres pitcher had ever thrown a no-hitter. On July 18 against the Philadelphia Phillies, Steve Arlin came within one out of a no-hitter before a Denny Doyle single broke up the bid.

Season standings

Record vs. opponents

Opening Day starters 
 Bob Barton
 Dave Campbell
 Nate Colbert
 Enzo Hernández
 Clay Kirby
 Leron Lee
 Jerry Morales
 Larry Stahl
 Derrel Thomas

Notable transactions 
 May 17, 1972: Ollie Brown was traded by the Padres to the Oakland Athletics for Curt Blefary, Mike Kilkenny and a player to be named later. The Athletics completed the deal by sending Greg Schubert (minors) to the Padres on September 11.
 June 6, 1972: 1972 Major League Baseball draft
Randy Jones was drafted by the Padres in the 5th round.
Warren Cromartie was drafted by the Padres in the 1st round (5th pick) of the Secondary Phase, but did not sign.

Roster

Player stats

Batting

Starters by position 
Note: Pos = Position; G = Games played; AB = At bats; H = Hits; Avg. = Batting average; HR = Home runs; RBI = Runs batted in

Other batters 
Note: G = Games played; AB = At bats; H = Hits; Avg. = Batting average; HR = Home runs; RBI = Runs batted in

Pitching

Starting pitchers 
Note: G = Games pitched; IP = Innings pitched; W = Wins; L = Losses; ERA = Earned run average; SO = Strikeouts

Other pitchers 
Note: G = Games pitched; IP = Innings pitched; W = Wins; L = Losses; ERA = Earned run average; SO = Strikeouts

Mike Corkins was the team leader in saves with 6.

Relief pitchers 
Note: G = Games pitched; W = Wins; L = Losses; SV = Saves; ERA = Earned run average; SO = Strikeouts

Awards and honors 

1972 Major League Baseball All-Star Game
Nate Colbert, reserve
Colbert scored the winning run, but he brought the wrong uniform with him to Atlanta. The San Diego Padres' slugger donned his road jersey with SAN DIEGO on it instead of his home one with PADRES on it.

One week later, Colbert returned to Atlanta Stadium and tied Stan Musial's Major League record with five home runs in a doubleheader vs. the Braves. Colbert also drove in 13 runs during the twinbill, which San Diego swept 9-0 and 11-7.

Farm system

References

External links
 1972 San Diego Padres at Baseball Reference
 1972 San Diego Padres at Baseball Almanac

San Diego Padres seasons
San Diego Padres season
San Diego Padres